Alexis Gamboa (born 20 March 1999) is a Costa Rican professional footballer who plays for Liga FPD club Alajuelense.

References

Belgian Pro League players
Costa Rican footballers
1999 births
Living people
Santos de Guápiles footballers
S.K. Beveren players
Association football defenders
Costa Rican expatriate footballers
Expatriate footballers in Belgium
Costa Rican expatriate sportspeople in Belgium
L.D. Alajuelense footballers
People from Limón Province
Costa Rica under-20 international footballers